Wassily Hoeffding (June 12, 1914 – February 28, 1991) was a Finnish statistician and probabilist. Hoeffding was one of the founders of nonparametric statistics, in which Hoeffding contributed the idea and basic results on U-statistics.

In probability theory, Hoeffding's inequality provides an upper bound on the probability for the sum of random variables to deviate from its expected value.

Personal life 
Hoeffding was born in Mustamäki, Finland, (Gorkovskoye, Russia since 1940), although his place of birth is registered as St. Petersburg on his birth certificate.  His father was an economist and a disciple of Peter Struve, the Russian social scientist and public figure. His paternal grandparents were Danish and his father's uncle was the Danish philosopher Harald Høffding. His mother, née Wedensky, had studied medicine. Both grandfathers had been engineers. In 1918 the family left Tsarskoye Selo for Ukraine and, after traveling through scenes of civil war, finally left Russia for Denmark in 1920, where Wassily entered school.

In 1924 the family settled in Berlin. Hoeffding obtained his PhD in 1940 at the University of Berlin. He migrated with his mother to the United States in 1946. His younger brother, Oleg, became a military historian in the United States.

Hoeffding's ashes were buried in a small cemetery on land owned by George E. Nicholson, Jr.'s family in Chatham County, NC about 11 miles south of Chapel Hill, NC.

Work 

In 1948, he introduced the concept of U-statistics.

See the collected works of Wassily Hoeffding.

Writings 
 Masstabinvariante Korrelationstheorie, 1940
 On the distribution of the rank correlation coefficient t when the variates are not independent in Biometrika, 1947
 A class of statistics with asymptotically normal distribution, 1948
 A nonparametric test for independence, 1948
 The central limit theorem for dependent random variables (with Herbert Robbins), 1948
 "Optimum" nonparametric tests, 1951
 A combinatorial central limit theorem, 1951
 The large-sample power of test based on permutations of observations, 1952
 On the distribution of the expected values of the order statistics, 1953
 The efficiency of tests (with J. R. Rosenblatt), 1955
 On the distribution of the number of successes in independent trials, 1956
 Distinguishability of sets of distributions. (The case of independent and identically distributed random variables.), (with Jacob Wolfowitz), 1958
 Lower bounds for the expected sample size and the average risk of a sequential procedure, 1960
 Probability inequalities for sums of bounded random variables, 1963

See also 
 Hoeffding's bounds
 Hoeffding's C1 statistic
 Hoeffding's decomposition
 Hoeffding's independence test
 Hoeffding's inequality
 Hoeffding's lemma
 Hoeffding–Blum–Kiefer–Rosenblatt process
 Terry–Hoeffding test

References

External links 
 

1914 births
1991 deaths
People from Vyborg District
People from Viipuri Province (Grand Duchy of Finland)
American people of Danish descent
Presidents of the Institute of Mathematical Statistics
Fellows of the American Statistical Association
American statisticians
Probability theorists
20th-century American mathematicians
White Russian emigrants to Germany
German emigrants to the United States
Finnish statisticians
Mathematical statisticians